The tre (Khmer: ត្រែ) is an ancient Cambodian trumpet, being recreated in modern times. Different styles have been recorded in the artwork of Angkor Wat. Styles include long and short straight trumpets, slightly curved trumpets and trumpets with a C-curve.

References

External links
 Straight trumpet (background) and conch-shell trumpet (foreground) recreated by ethnomusicologist Patrick Kersalé, from images at Angkor Wat.
 Illustration of a C-shaped trumpet, from an educational poster.

Cambodian musical instruments
Trumpets